Vern Taylor is a Canadian figure skater and coach. He is the 1978 and 1979 Canadian silver medalist and 1977 bronze medalist. At the 1978 World Figure Skating Championships, he became the first person to land a triple Axel jump in competition.

Competitive highlights

References

 
 
 

Canadian male single skaters
Living people
Year of birth missing (living people)